You Can't Catch Me is Maaya Sakamoto's seventh studio album. The first pressing came with a bonus CD featuring seven live tracks from Sakamoto's memorial concert "Gift" in Budokan on March 2010. A PV version for the track "Himitsu" was also made to promote the album. It is Sakamoto's first album to reach number one on the Oricon chart, and the first of either her albums or singles to do so.

Track listing

Charts

References

2011 albums
Maaya Sakamoto albums
FlyingDog albums